Rani Theni is a 1982 Tamil language film directed by G. N. Rangarajan, starring Kamal Haasan in an extended guest role. The film stars playback singer Deepan Chakravarthy, the son of Trichi Loganathan, a veteran playback singer in his first leading role. The female leads are played by Mahalakshmi / Shree and Vanitha Krishnachandran.

Kamal Haasan plays a comedy role with no connection with the main story and interacts only in one scene with the main villain Sivachandran, who plays the role of a playboy and Casanova; his character is killed by the heroine. The film was a remake of Telugu film Kukka Katuku Cheppu Debba.

Plot 

Parvathi, a girl with traditional values gets engaged to Selvam but Sekar, a womaniser, deceives her in the guise of Selvam.

Cast 
 Mahalakshmi as Parvathi
 Deepan Chakravarthy as Selvam
 Sivachandran as Sekar
 Vanitha Krishnachandran as Kanagam
 Charuhasan
 Thengai Srinivasan as Thulasilingum
 Kamal Haasan as Miller (Guest appearance)
 Y. G. Mahendra (Guest appearance)
 T. K. S. Natarajan

Soundtrack 
Soundtrack was composed by Ilaiyaraaja.

References

External links 
 

1980s Tamil-language films
1982 films
Films directed by G. N. Rangarajan
Films scored by Ilaiyaraaja
Tamil remakes of Telugu films